The DAR Solo is a Bulgarian ultralight aircraft, designed by Tony Ilieff and produced by Aeroplanes DAR, first flying in August 2008.

The aircraft is supplied as a kit for amateur construction or as a complete ready-to-fly-aircraft.

Design and development
The aircraft was designed to comply with the US FAR Part 103 Ultralight Vehicles rules as well as the German 120 kg class (called the Solo 120) and deregulated 115 kg class in the United Kingdom. It features a strut-braced high wing, a single-seat open cockpit, tricycle landing gear and a single engine in tractor configuration.

The aircraft is built with a composite fuselage and an aluminum wing. Its  span wing has flaperons and employs a single strut on each side supported by an optional jury strut. The standard engines used when the type was introduced were the  Hirth F33 and the  Hirth F23 two-stroke powerplants.

The design offers combinations of three types of wings, three types of engines and four types of wheels.

Specifications (Solo)

References

External links

Official video

Homebuilt aircraft
Single-engined tractor aircraft
2000s Bulgarian ultralight aircraft
Solo
High-wing aircraft